Luperosoma subsulcatum is a species of leaf beetle in the family Chrysomelidae. It is found in Central America and North America.

References

Further reading

 

Galerucinae
Articles created by Qbugbot
Beetles described in 1893
Taxa named by George Henry Horn